The following is a list of compositions by the composer Eric Ewazen.

Solo Music
Eric Ewazen website

Solo Brass and Piano

Trumpet
Sonata for Trumpet and Piano, (1995)
Ballade for a Ceremony, (1999)
Danzante, (2004)
Prayer and Praise, (2001)
Three Lyrics for Trumpet and Piano, (1990/2003)
A Song from the Heart, (2007)
Variations and Fugue on a Theme of Brahms, (2011)
Eternal Spring
Concerto for Trumpet and Piano
 Original version called Quintet for Trumpet and Strings (Also called Concerto for Trumpet and Strings)

French Horn
Sonata for Horn and Piano, (1992)
Concerto for Horn and Piano, (2002)
 Original for horn and string orchestra

Alto Trombone
Palmetto Suite for Alto Trombone and Piano, (2004)
Palmetto Suite for Alto Trombone and Orchestra, (2010)

Tenor Trombone
Sonata for Trombone and Piano, (1993)
Visions of Light, (2003)
Songs of Love and Loss, (2004)
 For tenor or bass trombone
Rhapsody for Trombone and Piano
 Original version for bass trombone and string orchestra

Bass Trombone
Concerto for Tuba or Bass Trombone and Piano, (1995)
Concertino for Bass Trombone and Trombone Choir, (1996)
Ballade for Bass Trombone and Piano, (1996)
 Original version for clarinet and string orchestra
Rhapsody for Bass Trombone and Piano, (1997)
 Original version for bass trombone and string orchestra
Songs for Love and Loss, (2004)
 For tenor or bass trombone

Tuba
Concerto for Tuba or Bass Trombone and Piano, (1995)

Solo Percussion and Piano

Marimba
Northern Lights, (1989)
Concerto for Marimba, (1999)
 Original version for marimba and string orchestra

Solo String and Piano

Violin
 Rhapsody for Violin and Piano, (1982)
 Sonata for Violin and Piano, (1991)
 Original version for cello and piano
 Concerto for Violin, (1997)
 Original version for violin and string orchestra

Cello
Sonata for Cello and Piano, (1973)

Double Bass
Sonata for Double Bass and Harpsichord, (1992)

Solo Woodwind and Piano

Flute
Concerto for Flute, (1989)
 Original version for flute, percussion, harp, and string orchestra
Ali'i Suite, (1994)

Oboe
Down a River of Time, (1999)
Original version for oboe and string orchestra

Clarinet
Ballade for Clarinet, (1987)
Original version for clarinet, harp, and string orchestra

Bassoon
Concerto for Bassoon, (2002)
 Original version for bassoon and wind ensemble

Solo Piano
 A Suite from the Cloud Forest, (1992)
 Sonata for Two Pianos, (1994)

Solo Organ
Concertino for Organ and Orchestra, (2017)

Chamber music

Brass

Trumpet
Fantasia for Seven Trumpets, (1991)
Prelude and Fugue for Trumpet Choir, (2000)
A Concert Fanfare for Trumpet Choir, (2000)
Sonoran Desert Harmonies: Trumpet Choir, (2003)
Sonatina for Two Trumpets, (2004)

Horn
Grand Canyon Octet: Horn Ensemble, (1996)
Legend of the Sleeping Bear: Horn Ensemble, (2001)
High Desert Octet: Horn Ensemble, (2002)
Woodland Quartet: Horn Quartet, (2003)

Trombone
Dagon II: Nine tracks of Bass Trombone, (1980)
 Can be performed with tenor and bass trombones
Concertino for Bass Trombone and Trombone Choir, (1996)
Fantasy and Double Fugue for Trombone Choir, (1997)
Capriccio for Bass Trombone and Trombone Choir, (1999)
Myths and Legends: Trombone Quartet, (2000)
Posaunenstadt: Trombone Choir, (2000)
Great Lakes Fanfare: Trombone Choir, (2002)
Eaglehawk for three trombones, (2005)

Brass Ensemble
Symphony in Brass: Brass Ensemble w/ Percussion, (1991)
A Western Fanfare: Brass Ensemble w/ Percussion, (1997)
Grand Canyon Sinfonia: Brass Ensemble, (2000)
 Original version for horn ensemble
Front Range Fanfare: Brass Ensemble w/ Percussion, (2003)

Brass Quintet
Acadia, (2016)
Colchester Fantasy, (1987)
Frost Fire, (1990)
A Western Fanfare, (1997)
Grand Valley Fanfare, (2001)

Mixed Brass
Pastorale: for Trumpet, Trombone and Piano, (1996)
 Original version was the middle movement of Ballade, Pastorale and Dance for flute, horn, and piano
A Philharmonic Fanfare: for Trumpet, Horn, and Trombone, (1997)
An Elizabethan Songbook: for Trumpet, Trombone and Piano, (1998)
 Original for mezzo-soprano, tenor, and piano
Trio for Trombone, Tuba, and Piano, (2012)

Percussion

Percussion Ensemble
The Palace of Nine Perfections, (2000)

Strings / Strings and Piano
Piano Quartet, (1985)
Piano Trio, (1991)
String Quintet, (1994)
The Diamond World, (1996)
String Quartet, (1997)
 Original version for string quintet

Woodwinds

Woodwind Quintet
Roaring Fork Quintet for Wind Instruments, (1997)
Cascadian Concerto: Woodwind Quintet with Piano, (2003)
 Original version with orchestra
Cumberland Suite for Woodwind Quintet, (2012)

Mixed Ensemble
Trio for Bassoon, Horn and Piano, (1983)
Quintet for Trumpet and Strings, (1990)
...to cast a shadow again: medium low voice, trumpet, and piano, (1991)
Trio for Trumpet, Violin and Piano, (1992)
Mosaics: Flute, Bassoon, Marimba, (1993)
Ballade, Pastorale and Dance: Flute, Horn, and Piano, (1993)
Mandala: Flute, Clarinet, Trumpet, Violin, Cello, (1999)
Art of the City: Clarinet, Horn, String Quartet, (2000)
Bridgehampton Suite: Flute, Violin, Viola, Piano, (2006)
Trio for Trumpet, Cello and Piano, (2007)
Trio for Horn, Violin, and Piano, (2008-09)
Trio for Clarinet, Viola, and Piano, (2012)
Quintet for Heckelphone and String Quartet, (2018)

Wind Ensemble

Wind Ensemble
Celtic Hymns and Dances, (1995)
A Hymn for the Lost and the Living: In Memoriam, September 11, 2001: For Symphonic Band, (2001)

Soloist(s) and Wind Ensemble
Shadowcatcher, Concerto for Brass Quintet and Symphony Band, (1996)
On Wings of Song: Concerto for Piccolo and Wind Ensemble, (2010)

Wind Ensemble

Soloist(s) and Orchestra
Triple Concerto for Three Trombones and Orchestra, (2013)

Lists of compositions by composer